Hostel: Part III is a 2011 American horror film directed by Scott Spiegel and the third and final installment of the Hostel film series. It was written by Michael D. Weiss. This is the only film in the series to not have Eli Roth involved in the production and is also the only one not to have a theatrical release. The film also relocates the Elite Hunting Club from Slovakia to Las Vegas.

The plot centers on four men attending a bachelor party in Las Vegas. While there, they are enticed by two prostitutes to join them at a private party way off the Strip. Once there, they are horrified to find themselves the subjects of a perverse game of torture, where members of the Elite Hunting Club are hosting the most sadistic show in town. It was released direct-to-DVD on December 27, 2011.

Plot
A young man named Travis goes into a hotel room where a Ukrainian couple, Victor and Anka, are currently staying. Anka and Victor fall unconscious after being drugged by the beer Travis gave them, and it is revealed that Travis is a member of the Elite Hunting Club. Victor later wakes up in a cell in an abandoned building and watches as two guards drag Anka out of her cell.

Scott leaves his fiancée Amy to go to Las Vegas with his friend Carter for Scott's bachelor party. There, they meet up with their other friends, Mike and Justin. The four go to a nightclub, where they meet Kendra and Nikki, two escorts Carter secretly paid to have sex with Scott. Kendra and Nikki tell the four men about a "freaky" party they could go to on the other end of town, and the four men take a cab to an abandoned building. At the party, Kendra makes a move on Scott, but he declines and tells her about how he previously cheated on Amy and almost lost her, and does not want it to happen again. Scott wakes up the next morning in his hotel room with Carter and Justin. The three wonder where Mike is, as he is not answering his phone.

Mike wakes in a cell and starts panicking. Two guards strap him to a chair in an empty room, with one wall made of glass, and Mike is on display to be gambled upon by wealthy clients. A middle-aged client dressed as a doctor enters the room; Mike pleads with him, but the man cuts and peels Mike's face off. Worried about Mike, Scott, Carter, and Justin travel to Nikki's trailer, but cannot find her. Kendra arrives and reveals that Nikki is missing as well. Meanwhile, Nikki is brought into the same room as Mike and strapped to a table. Another man who speaks in Hungarian  enters the room and releases a jar full of cockroaches onto Nikki, some of which crawl into her mouth and suffocate her.

Scott, Carter, Justin, and Kendra get a text from Mike's phone, sent by Travis, to meet him and Nikki in a hotel room. When they get there, everyone is kidnapped by Travis and wakes up in individual cells along with Victor. The two guards take Justin away, and Carter calls the guard and informs them that he is also a client. After he shows his Elite Hunting Club tattoo, the guards let him go.

Justin is strapped into a chair and Carter, Flemming, and Travis watch as a costumed woman shoots him with multiple crossbow bolts. The main event starts and Scott is strapped into a chair. He asks Carter why he is doing this, and Carter reveals he wants Amy for himself, as they were in a relationship before she ended up with Scott. Carter says he was disappointed that Amy stayed with Scott after Carter told her about Scott's infidelity. He says that once Scott dies, he will comfort Amy and she will want to be with him.

Flemming orders Scott to be let go from the chair, and Scott and Carter fight. Scott ends up stabbing Carter, cuts off Carter's tattoo, and then escapes by using Carter's tattoo on the scanners. Victor kills one of the guards and frees himself, but is killed by another guard. Scott calls the cops and frees Kendra, who is shot dead by Travis. Flemming orders all of the prisoners to be killed. Scott and Travis fight and Scott kills Travis. Flemming sets the building to explode and attempts to drive away, but Carter kills him and takes his car. Carter sees Scott and locks the front gate before Scott can get to him. He then quickly drives off while the building explodes, with Scott still inside the gates.

Sometime later, Carter is comforting Amy in her house. After inviting him to stay the night, Amy reveals that Scott is still alive and pins Carter's hand to a chair with a corkscrew. A burned Scott appears and the pair strap him to a chair in her garage, where Scott kills him with a lightweight gas-powered tiller.

Cast

Production

In June 2008, it was announced that Scott Spiegel, one of the executive producers of Hostel and Hostel: Part II, was in talks to direct the third film in the series. In July 2009, Eli Roth confirmed that he would not be directing Hostel: Part III. Total Film later reported that Eli Roth would be involved, albeit as producer only, and that the film will abandon the European locations of the previous films in favor of an American setting, by the release of the film Roth was not credited. A trailer for the film was released in October 2011 confirming the film's Las Vegas setting.

Release
There were meant to be many viral marketing tools attached to the film including a collection of QR codes that would if scanned, give exclusive content. One can be seen at 1:09:26 in the film. Due to the film's negative reception from test audiences  the marketing campaign was dropped. Scanning the code results in the phrase "top left 8" being displayed.

Hostel: Part III was released on DVD and video on demand on December 27, 2011, in the United States, and on January 18, 2012, in Europe.

On Rotten Tomatoes, the film has an approval rating of 67% based on 6 reviews, with an average rating of 6.3/10.

References

External links
 
 

2011 films
2011 horror films
2010s serial killer films
American serial killer films
American sequel films
Direct-to-video horror films
Direct-to-video sequel films
Films directed by Scott Spiegel
Films scored by Frederik Wiedmann
Films set in the Las Vegas Valley
Films shot in Michigan
Films shot in the Las Vegas Valley
Hungarian-language films
Splatterpunk
Stage 6 Films films
2010s English-language films
2010s American films